Jesse James (1847–1882) was an American outlaw.

Jesse James may also refer to:

People
 Jesse E. James (1875–1951), only surviving son of American outlaw Jesse James
 Jesse James (Texas politician) (1904–1977), Texas State Treasurer
 Jesse James (singer) (born James McClelland, 1943), American soul singer
 Jesse James (songwriter), writer of the 1968 hit instrumental "The Horse"
 Jesse James (television personality) (born 1969), American custom vehicle manufacturer and television personality
 Jesse James (wrestler) (born 1969), American professional wrestler best known as "Road Dogg" Jesse James
 Jesse James (Wisconsin politician) (born 1972), member of the Wisconsin State Assembly
 Jesse James (actor) (born 1989), American actor
 Jesse James Dupree (born 1962), musician
 Jesse James Keitel, American actress, writer, and artist

Athletes
 John James (footballer, born 1948) (1948–2021), English soccer player nicknamed Jesse James
 Jesse James (center) (born 1971), American football center
 Jesse James (tight end) (born 1994), American football tight end

Arts and entertainment

Film
Jesse James (1927 film), a Paramount silent film
Jesse James (1939 film), starring Tyrone Power and Henry Fonda

Music
 "Jesse James" (folk song), a 19th-century American folk song
 "Jesse James" (Clay Walker song), a 2012 song by Clay Walker

Other uses
Jesse James (Lucky Luke), a 1969 Lucky Luke comic title
The Jesse James Gang, a political group led by Bill Ayers and Diana Oughton

See also
 Jesse Jaymes, American rapper and entrepreneur
 Jessie James (born 1988), American singer now known as Jessie James Decker
 Jessie James (album), 2009, by Jessie James
 Jessie and James, characters in the Pokémon anime television series
 Jessica James (disambiguation)